Sint Nicolaasga is a village in the Dutch province of Friesland. It is located in the municipality of De Fryske Marren, and had a population of around 3330 in 2017.

History
The oldest listing of the village dates from about 1399 by the name Sinte Nyclaesga. At the Protestant Reformation in 1580 the priest of Sint Nicolaasga, Nicolaus Hollandinus, went into exile and the church, cemetery and property of the parsonage changed hands. The religious exercises of the Catholics took place in a hidden church on de Heide until a new church was built in 1853. The church was used until 1885. Then people started to build the church of Saint Nicholas (Sint-Nicolaaskerk), which still stands. The patron saint of the parish is Nicolaas van Myra. There is a Lourdes Grotto near the church.

Before 2014, Sint Nicolaasga was part of the Skarsterlân municipality and before 1984 it was part of Doniawerstal.

Notable residents
The model Marjan Jonkman was born in Sint Nicolaasga.

Current Mercedes-EQ Formula E Team Driver and Mercedes-AMG Petronas F1 Team Reserve Driver Nyck De Vries was raised in Sint Nicolaasga.

Gallery

References

External links

De Fryske Marren
Populated places in Friesland